Team Liquid is a multi-regional professional esports organization based in the Netherlands that was founded in 2000. With the release of StarCraft II: Wings of Liberty, Team Liquid signed their first professional players.

In 2012, Team Liquid acquired a North American Dota 2 team, marking their first venture into multi-genre management. In January 2015, Team Liquid officially merged with Team Curse under the Liquid banner, bringing on Steve Arhancet, his supporting staff, and former Curse League of Legends, Street Fighter, and Super Smash Bros. teams. Their European Dota 2 squad won The International 2017, which had one of the largest prize pools for any esports tournament in history. Team Liquid's League of Legends team has won four LCS titles, and their Counter-Strike Global Offensive team was awarded the Intel Grand Slam prize in 2019 after winning four tournaments in just 63 days. Team Liquid also has Rainbow Six Siege, Free Fire and Valorant teams in Brazil.

History
The website was released on May 1, 2001, by Victor "Nazgul" Goossens and Joy "Meat" Hoogeveen under the domain teamliquid.cjb.net. On September 22, 2002, the website was moved to the address of teamliquid.net. A day later the very first poll was posted as a vote for the website's name with the teamliquid.net name winning over other suggestions such as likwit.com. On April 5, 2019, it was announced that the website would be moving to the domain tl.net, with teamliquid.net becoming an alias for teamliquid.com in the future.

Although Team Liquid was primarily known as a StarCraft news site, there are many sub sections on the forums dedicated to other games as well. It was announced on August 30, 2012, that Team Liquid would be expanding to covering Dota 2 news. On December 8, 2012, Liquid expanded their esports franchise into multiple games for the first time, with the recruitment of a North American Dota 2 team.

On January 6, 2015, Steven "LiQuiD112" Arhancet joined Victor Goossens as co-owner of Team Liquid, officially commencing the merge between former Team Curse Gaming under the Team Liquid banner.

On September 27, 2016, Team Liquid sold its controlling interest to aXiomatic Gaming, an investment group including Golden State Warriors co-owner Peter Guber, entrepreneur Ted Leonsis, motivational speaker Tony Robbins, basketball Hall of Famer Magic Johnson, and AOL co-founder Steve Case.

On December 16, 2017, Team Liquid disbanded their Halo roster.

Ownership

aXiomatic is an entertainment and sports management company. Investors for the group include businesspeople Peter Guber, Tony Robbins, former NBA player Magic Johnson, Ted Leonsis, and technology Steve Case, Eric Lefkofsky. The chief executive officer is Bruce Stein, the former chief executive officer and chief operating officer of Mattel Toys, Sony Interactive Entertainment and Kenner Products (Hasbro). On September 27, 2016, aXiomatic announced that it had acquired controlling interest of esports organization Team Liquid.

Other investors include Los Angeles Dodgers executives Lon Rosen and Tucker Kain, Golden State Warriors executives Rick Welts and Kirk Lacob, the Washington Nationals owners at Lerner Enterprises, Chicago Cubs president of business operations Crane Kenney, Donn Davis, co-founder of Revolution and managing partner of Revolution Growth, Zach Leonsis, VP and general manager of Monumental Sports Network, Mark Ein, chairman of Kastle Systems, CEO of Capitol Acquisition Corp, and founder and owner of the Washington Kastles, and former NFL player Dhani Jones.

It was announced that Victor Goossens and Steve Arhancet would continue their roles as co-CEOs of Team Liquid after the acquisition.

In December 2021, five players signed by Team Liquid became co-owners: basketball player Aerial Powers, amateur Super Smash Bros. player (and actor) Asa "Stimpy" Butterfield, Counter-Strike: Global Offensive player Jonathan "EliGE" Jablonowski, Super Smash Bros. player Juan "Hungrybox' DeBiedma, and poker streamer and competitor Lex Veldhuis.

In January 2022, Team Liquid signed the World of Warcraft guild Limit, making Limit's guild leader and team captain Max "Maximum" Smith a co-owner.

Websites

Main websites 
TLnet – Originally branded as "Team Liquid", the tl.net website primarily provides StarCraft II coverage but also has some coverage for StarCraft Brood War, Counter-Strike Global Offensive, Heroes of the Storm, and Super Smash Brothers Melee. With the launch of StarCraft II, TLnet has grown into the largest StarCraft community on the internet, with over 220,000 active members and over twenty four million total posts. The website employs four person full-time staff at their New York City office to work on the site.
Team Liquid – Website focusing on Team Liquid esports team coverage.
Liquipedia – Is a volunteer-run wiki covering various esports, beginning with Starcraft: Brood War and currently covering more than 40 titles.

Tournaments and events 
In addition to running a community site and team, Team Liquid also hosts a variety of tournaments and events.

Team Liquid Starleague 
The two iterations of the TeamLiquid Starleague (or TSL for short) have been the largest StarCraft: Brood War tournaments outside of South Korea. The first TSL sponsored by Razer in 2008 was highly anticipated at the time, sporting all of the world's top Brood War players. It was topped one year later with 2009's TSL 2, which featured a total prize pool of over $20,000 and remains the largest non-Korean Brood War tournament to date.
With the release of Starcraft II, Team Liquid announced a third installment, sponsored again by PokerStrategy.com with a prize pool of $34,700.  The tournament took place between March and May 2011. On April 25, 2012, a fourth installment was announced (TSL 4).

Team Liquid StarCraft II Open 
The TL Opens are one-day open single-elimination tournaments alternating between the NA and EU battle.net servers. The eight TL Open events that lead up to the TSL 3 also served as a qualifier for the TSL.

Team Liquid Legacy Starleague 
Announced on January 1, 2013, Team Liquid would be hosting a series of online tournaments for "foreign" players of StarCraft: Brood War.

Community events 
TL Attack: Modeled after a Korean TV show called Bnet Attack, a professional player plays games against non-professionals while chatting with the hosts.
Liquibition: A King-of-the-Hill mode that is played best of 7 games.
TL Arena: A professional player will be matched up with inferior opponents. With each win he gains, another handicap is added that limits his game play options, until he loses or he has defeated a certain number of opponents.

Esports history

StarCraft and StarCraft II
The gaming clan "Liquid" was founded by Victor "Nazgul" Goossens near the end of 2000, after he decided to leave his previous clan. Liquid started with four members for the first months and grew to eight players over the following year. The members of the Liquid clan were handpicked by Goossens.

With the arrival of StarCraft II, Team Liquid announced plans to become an active professional esports team. Shortly after, sponsorship by The Little App Factory was announced, which qualified them as a sponsored professional team. This allowed Team Liquid to pay their players a salary and send the team to events around the world. The team created a dedicated news site separate from the more community oriented site, announced and released on May 10, 2011.

On August 13, 2012, three players traveled to Korea in order to live in the OGS training house and compete in GOMTV's Global StarCraft II League (GSL).
Of the three players entering the preliminaries, only one, Dario "TLO" Wünsch qualified for the first two GSL events. He was eliminated out in the Second and First rounds respectively.

The third GSL was the strongest showing of Team Liquid thus far. Three players, Hayder "Haypro" Hussein, Jos "Ret" de Kroon and Jonathan "Jinro" Walsh qualified for the main tournament. While Hussein lost first round and de Kroon in 2nd, Walsh made to the semi-finals, losing 0–4 to the eventual winner Jang "MC" Min-Chul.

In 2012, during GSL Season 2, members Song "HerO" Hyeon Deok and Yun "TaeJa" Young Seo made it to the Round of 8 of the Code S tournament, with TaeJa being eliminated while HerO advanced to the semi-finals of the tournament.

Smash Bros.
In March 2014, Team Liquid announced that it had picked up two Melee players: Ken, who is known as the "King of Smash" and KoreanDJ, who is widely considered as the first player to defeat Mew2King ever since he was considered a God, thus starting its Smash team. After acquiring Curse Gaming, it also signed Hungrybox, who is considered to be one of the Five Gods of Melee, and Chillin, who was the first player to defeat Ken during his prime. On August 11, 2015, it picked up top Super Smash Bros. for Wii U player Nairo, who was the only player to knock ZeRo out of a tournament, ending ZeRo's 55 win tournament streak at MLG World Finals. On September 28, 2015, Team Liquid announced that KoreanDJ resigned from the organization and retired from competitive Smash, citing persistent hand and wrist pains.

League of Legends
On January 6, 2015, Liquid acquired the Team Curse's League of Legends roster, which consisted of Quas, IWillDominate, Voyboy, Cop, and Xpecial. The team finished the LCS Spring regular season in 6th place with a 10–9 record. On Week 5 and 6 of NA LCS Piglet was benched and replaced on the starting roster by KEITHMCBRIEF in an effort to try to improve their standings. In the playoffs they beat Counter Logic Gaming 3–0, before losing to Cloud9 3–2 and finishing in 3rd.

Team Liquid was very successful in 2018 and 2019, winning four LCS splits in a row.  In the 2018 NA LCS season, Liquid had a roster of Impact, Xmithie, Pobelter, Doublelift, and Olleh.  At the 2018 League of Legends World Championship, Liquid went 3–3 in groups and failed to advance.  In the 2019 LCS season, Liquid replaced Pobelter with Jensen and Olleh with CoreJJ.  Liquid failed to make it out of groups at the 2019 League of Legends World Championship, however, as their 3–3 record was insufficient to advance.  In 2020, Broxah joined the team as jungler, replacing Xmithie.  The 2020 Spring Split went very poorly for Liquid; they finished ninth place out of ten.  Doublelift was benched due to motivation issues and replaced by Academy ADC Tactical, and Doublelift was eventually traded to Team SoloMid for the summer split, with Tactical promoted to starter.  Liquid finished third that summer split and made it to 2020 League of Legends World Championship, but again their 3–3 record was insufficient to advance to the quarterfinals.  In 2021, Santorin replaced Broxah as jungler, and LEC import Alphari replaced Impact as top laner.  The team once again got a 3–3 record in groups at the 2021 League of Legends World Championship; this qualified them for a tiebreaker match with Gen.G, but Liquid lost and failed to advance.

The 2022 season saw a major shake-up of the roster, as the Honda sponsorship allowed the creation of a "super team" of Bwipo, Santorin, Bjergsen, Hans Sama, and CoreJJ.  Despite high expectations and finishing third place in the regular season of the summer split, Liquid narrowly failed to earn a Worlds slot in the playoffs, a disappointment that caused a major controversy. Hans Sama left the team at the end of the season. On 26 September 2022 they also released Guilhoto from the head coach position.

Other
One week after the Curse merger, it was announced that Team Liquid acquired a Counter Strike: Global Offensive team that previously played under the title "Denial eSports".

On October 9, 2015, it was announced that Liquid would once again be fielding a Dota team, after being absence from the competitive DotA scene for more than a year.

On August 7, 2020, Team Liquid announced their entrance to the Valorant esports scene by signing the fish123 roster, soulcas, Kryptix, L1NK, ec1s. Alongside these four players, they also added ScreaM as the fifth player. On February 24, 2021, Team Liquid parted ways with ec1s and added Jamppi into the roster. On 22 September 2022, they were announced as one of the 10 partner teams for the Valorant EMEA league.

Sponsors
On January 24, 2015, it was announced that HTC had become an official sponsor of Team Liquid.

In June 2022, Liquid got Honda as a major sponsor for their League of Legends team.  The League team was renamed "Team Liquid Honda" as a result.

Management
Victor "Nazgul" Goossens is a founding member, and currently co-owner and chief executive officer of Team Liquid. He originally competed in Brood War prior to forming Team Liquid.

Steve "LiQuiD112" Arhancet joined the Team Liquid staff when Team Curse merged with Team Liquid. Since the merge, Steve has taken the role of co-owner and chief executive officer and primarily manages the League of Legends team.

Alienware Training Facility 
In 2017 Team Liquid finished constructing its Alienware Training Facility in Los Angeles, which is designed to act as the training grounds for Team Liquid's CS:GO and League of Legends teams, as well as their esports headquarters. The facility houses non-players such as owner Steve "LiQuiD112" Arhancet and 1UP Studios, Team Liquid's in-house production studio, so that all departments of Team Liquid could work together. Team Liquid's sponsor Alienware supplied all the PC's to the Alienware Training Facility.

References

External links
 

 

 
Esports websites
Dutch sport websites
Counter-Strike teams
Hearthstone teams
Esports teams based in the Netherlands
Fighting game player sponsors
Heroes of the Storm teams
Internet properties established in 2000
League of Legends Championship Series teams
StarCraft teams
Super Smash Bros. player sponsors
Defunct and inactive Overwatch teams
Dota teams
Team Razer
Tom Clancy's Rainbow Six Siege teams
Esports teams established in 2000
American Internet groups
Valorant teams